Colette Rosambert-Boegner was a French tennis player.

Rosambert learnt to play tennis from the professional Albert Burke in Deauville.

She notably reached the final of the women's doubles at the French Open in 1933, with her compatriot Sylvie Jung Henrotin. The following year, she won the mixed-doubles tournament there, with Jean Borotra. She won the All England Plate in 1933, a tennis competition held at the Wimbledon Championships which consisted of players who were defeated in the first or second rounds of the singles competition.

In 1934, she won the singles title at the French Covered Court Championships.

Grand Slam finals

Doubles

Mixed doubles

References

French female tennis players
French Championships (tennis) champions
Grand Slam (tennis) champions in mixed doubles
1910 births
Year of death missing